The Banu Udhrah was a Himyari Jewish tribe during the era of the Islamic Prophet Muhammad which converted to Islam after the Expedition of Ukasha bin Al-Mihsan in  627. During this expedition Muhammad ordered an attack on the Banu Assad bin Qhuzayma to capture spoils. The Battle of Tabouk took place in October 630   to attack the Byzantine empire. Mubarakpuri claims that the reason was revenge for the killing of one of Muhammad's ambassadors by a Christian chief of al-Balaqa, which led to the Battle of Mutah. Mubrakpuri claims this was also the reason for the Battle of Tabouk, and that there was a rumour that Heraclius was preparing an attack on the Muslims.  William Muir claims Heraclius wanted to prevent the recurrence of Muslim attacks such as the Expedition of Ukasha bin Al-Mihsan against the Banu Udrah tribe. A tribe that was aligned to the Byzantine Empire

The Banu Udhrah members participated in the Battle of the Confederates against the Muslims then they made peace agreement with the Muslims to pay tribute (Jizya).

See also 
List of battles of Muhammad

References 

Udhrah
Yemeni tribes